is a 1985 Japanese science fantasy horror OVA film produced by Ashi Productions, in association with Epic/Sony Records, CBS/Sony Group Inc. and Movic. The screenplay is based on the first in the long-running series of light novels written by Hideyuki Kikuchi.

Billed by the Japanese producers as a "dark future science-fiction romance", the film, like the novel before it, is set in the year 12,090 AD, in a post-nuclear holocaust world where a young woman hires a mysterious half-vampire, half-human vampire hunter to protect her from a powerful vampire lord. It was one of several anime films featured in the music video for Michael and Janet Jackson's song "Scream".

Plot 

While walking her guard rounds in the country, Doris Lang, the orphaned daughter of a deceased werewolf hunter, is attacked and bitten by Count Magnus Lee, a 10,000-year-old vampire lord (also known as a Noble) for trespassing in his domain.

Doris later encounters a mysterious vampire hunter, known only as D. Infected from Count Lee's bite, she hires D to kill the vampire and save her from becoming one. While in town with D and her younger brother Dan, Doris is confronted by Greco Rohman, the mayor's son, who offers to help if he has Doris for himself, but she refuses. D requests that the authorities, including Greco's father, the town sheriff, and Dr. Ferringo, should hold off Doris' incarceration at the local asylum until he kills Count Lee.

That night, Doris's farm is attacked by Rei Ginsei, Count Lee's servant, and L'Armica, Count Lee's daughter, who is highly prejudiced against humans. During the battle, Rei reveals he has the ability to twist space around him. Because of these powers, D's attacks are redirected onto himself, but he quickly recovers from his wounds, revealing him to be a dhampir. After fending off L'Armica, he orders the pair to leave with a warning to Count Lee. The next day, D travels to Count Lee's castle and attempts to confront him. Aided by the symbiote in his Left Hand, D holds his own against the Count's monstrous minions. Doris is then kidnapped by Rei and brought to the Count. Using his vampiric powers, D rescues Doris and escapes the castle.

Later, Greco overhears a meeting between Count Lee's messenger and Rei, during which the former gives the latter a candle with Time-Bewitching Incense, a substance powerful enough to weaken anyone with vampire blood. Rei takes Dan hostage to lure D out into the open, and D comes to his rescue, cutting off Rei's hand in the process and discovering that the candle is a fake. Meanwhile, Dr. Ferringo turns out to be a vampire in league with Count Lee. He leads Doris into a trap but is killed by L'Armica after requesting to share Doris with the Count. Greco, who stole the candle from Rei, then appears and uses it to weaken L'Armica. He is then shot at by Dan and falls down a cliff. Afterwards, Doris, who has by now fallen for D, tries to convince him to live with her and embraces him. This triggers D's vampire side, and he forces her away from him, unwilling to bite her.

The next morning, Rei kills Greco and uses the real candle to weaken D. Rei then mortally wounds the vampire hunter with a wooden stake. Doris is captured and taken back to the castle. Rei requests that the Count give him eternal life as a member of the Nobility, but is coldly rebuffed for his past failures. As a mutant attempts to devour D's comatose body, his Left Hand revives him just in time for him to kill the monster. As the processional for the Count and Doris' wedding takes place, Dan attempts to attack Lee. Unfortunately, he fails and falls into a chasm before being saved by Rei. Rei attempts to weaken the Count with the candle. However, Lee is too powerful and destroys it with his telekinetic abilities before killing Rei. Before Doris can be bitten by the Count, D appears and fights Lee. D's attacks are futile due to Lee's psychic abilities. About to be killed, D unleashes his own telekinetic power and succeeds in stabbing Lee in the heart. With Lee dying, his castle begins crumbling. D tries to persuade L'Armica into living as a human, but she chooses to die with her father and stays in the castle as it falls.

D, Doris, and Dan escape the collapsing castle. D then sets off under a now clear blue sky. Doris, now recovered from her bite, and Dan bid D goodbye as he looks back briefly at them and smiles.

Voice cast

Production 
Vampire Hunter D is credited as one of the earliest anime productions targeted explicitly at the male teenager/adult demographic in lieu of family audiences, and capitalized on the emerging OVA market due to its violent content and influence from European horror mythology (such as the films of British film studio Hammer Film Productions). The film's limited budget made its technical quality comparable to most anime television series and other OVAs, but not with most theatrical animated films.

During the film's production, director Toyoo Ashida stated that his intention for the film was to create an OVA that people who had been tired from studying or working hard would enjoy watching, instead of watching something that would make them "feel even more tired".

Yoshitaka Amano, the illustrator of the original novels, acted as character designer for the OVA. However, alternative designs were provided by Ashida (who also acted as the film's animation director), and elements from both artists’ works were combined to create final designs by the animators. Acclaimed pop artist Tetsuya Komuro was responsible for the film's soundtrack, and also performed the film's ending theme, 'Your Song', with his fellow members of TM Network.

Vampire Hunter D was the first of several film adaptations (both live-action and animated) of Hideyuki Kikuchi's works. Several of these (Wicked City, Demon City Shinjuku and Vampire Hunter D: Bloodlust) were directed by Yoshiaki Kawajiri of Madhouse.

Release 
Vampire Hunter D was released on theatrically on December 21, 1985 where it was distributed by Toho. A laserdisc by CBS Sony Group Inc. was released on the same date. A Region 2 DVD release of the film was released by SME Visual Works in Japan on February 21, 2001. An English-language version of the OVA was produced in 1992 by Streamline Pictures, and was shown on the fine-arts theatrical circuit in the US in August 1992. The Streamline dub was then released on VHS on March 26, 1993. This initial release was followed by a re-release on VHS by Streamline's parent company, Orion Pictures, and a laserdisc release by Lumivison. The film was also shown several times on American television during the 1990s, including on TBS, Cartoon Network and the Sci-Fi Channel. Vampire Hunter D is considered a flagship title for Streamline, and was marketed in the US as ‘the first animated horror film for adults.’

In 2000, Urban Vision Entertainment, the US production partner and distributor of Vampire Hunter D: Bloodlust, re-released the OVA on a ‘Special Edition’ bilingual DVD on October 17 containing the original Japanese audio and a Dolby Digital 5.1 remix of the Streamline dub, as well as releasing dubbed and subtitled versions of the film on VHS. The Special Edition DVD release was duplicated by Manga Entertainment for a UK release on July 5, 2004, as well as by Madman Entertainment in Australia on August 31, 2005. Madman reissued their Special Edition DVD on July 23, 2014.

On April 16, 2015, Sentai Filmworks announced their license to the film in North America for digital and home video release. The film was released on August 25, 2015 on Blu-ray and DVD with a new English dub.

Footnotes

References

External links 
 
 
 

Vampire Hunter D
1985 action films
1985 fantasy films
1985 anime films
1985 films
1985 horror films
Action anime and manga
Aniplex
Ashi Productions
Dark fantasy anime and manga
Dracula films
Fiction set in the 7th millennium or beyond
Films directed by Toyoo Ashida
Films set in castles
Films set in the future
Japanese action horror films
Japanese animated horror films
Japanese supernatural horror films
Sentai Filmworks
Toho animated films
Vampires in animated film
Werewolves in animated film
1980s American films

ja:吸血鬼ハンターD#OVA